Adiga is a surname from coastal Karnataka in India. It is found among Hindus of the Shivalli Brahmin community.
Adiga surname is also referred to temple pooja priest in coastal Karnataka

Notable people

The following is a list of notable people with last name Adiga.

 Aravind Adiga, author of the book White Tiger, winner of the Man Booker Prize in 2008
 Gopalakrishna Adiga, pioneer of Navya-style poetry
 K. Suryanarayana Adiga, Indian lawyer and politician
 Rakesh Adiga, Indian film actor

 Raksha Adiga, Singer

References

Indian surnames